Première dame d'honneur ('first lady of honour'), or simply dame d'honneur ('lady of honour'), was an office at the royal court of France. It existed in nearly all French courts from the 16th-century onward. Though the tasks of the post shifted, the dame d'honneur was normally the first or second rank of all ladies-in-waiting. The dame d'honneur was selected from the members of the highest French nobility.

History

The office was created in 1523. 

The term Dame d'honneur has also been used as a general term for a (married) French lady-in-waiting. Initially, the married ladies-in-waiting who attended the queen of France had the title Dame. This was simply the title of a married lady-in-waiting, who was not the principal lady-in-waiting. 

From 1523, the group of 'Dame', (married) ladies-in-waiting who attended the court as companions of the queen had the formal title Dame d'honneur ('Lady of Honour', commonly only 'Dame'), hence the title 'Première dame d'honneur' ('First lady of honour') to distinguish between the principal lady-in-waiting and the group of remaining (married) ladies-in-waiting.  In 1674, the position of Fille d'honneur was abolished, and the 'Dames' were renamed Dame du Palais.  Thus, the title Dame d'honneur was henceforth reserved for one office holder.

Tasks

The task of the dame d'honneur was to supervise the female courtiers, control the budget, order necessary purchases, and organize the annual account and staff list; she supervised the daily routine and attended both ordinary and ceremonial court functions, as well as escorting and introducing those seeking audience with the queen. She had the keys to the queen's personal rooms in her possession. 

When the Dame d'honneur was absent, she was replaced by the Dame d'atour, who normally had the responsibility of overseeing the queen's wardrobe and jewelry in addition to dressing the queen. 

In 1619, the office of the Surintendante de la Maison de la Reine, or simply surintendante, was created.  The surintendante had roughly the same tasks as the Dame d'honneur—receiving the oath of the female personnel before they took office, supervising the daily routine of the staff and the queen, organizing the accounts and staff list—but she was placed in rank above the dame d'honneur. Whenever the surintendante was absent, she was replaced by the dame d'honneur.  The post of Surintendante could be left vacant for long periods, such as between the death of Marie Anne de Bourbon in 1741 and the appointment of Princess Marie Louise of Savoy in 1775.

Later history
The position of Dame d'honneur was revived during the First Empire, when the principal lady-in-waiting to the empress held the same title.

During the Second Empire, the dame d'honneur had the same position as before, but was now formally ranked second below a surintendante with the title Grande-Maîtresse.

List of Premières dames d'honneur to the queens and empresses of France
Though the office was commonly only referred to as "Dame d'honneur", this list use the full title of "Première dame d'honneur".

Première dame d'honneur  to Eleanor of Austria 1530–1547

 1530–1535 : Louise de Montmorency
 1535–1538 : Jeanne d'Angoulême, dame de Givry 
 Beatrix Pacheco d'Ascalona, comtesse de Montbel d'Entremont

Première dame d'honneur to Catherine de' Medici 1547–1589

 1547–1560: Françoise de Brézé
 1560–1561: Jacqueline de Longwy
 1561–1578: Philippe de Montespedon
 1578–1589: Alphonsine Strozzi, comtesse de Fiesque

Première dame d'honneur  to Mary Stuart 1559–1560

 1559–1560: Guillemette de Sarrebruck

Première dame d'honneur  to Elisabeth of Austria 1570–1574

 1570–1574: Madeleine of Savoy

Première dame d'honneur  to Louise of Lorraine 1575–1601

 1575–1583: Jeanne de Dampierre
 1583–1585: Louise de Cipierre (jointly with de Randan)
 1583–1601: Fulvie de Randan (jointly with de Cipierre)

Première dame d'honneur  to Marie de' Medici 1600–1632
 1600–1632: Antoinette de Pons

Première dame d'honneur  to Anne of Austria 1615–1666
For the first years in France, before her Spanish entourage was sent back to Spain, Anne had both a French and a Spanish office holder in several posts of her court.

 1615–1618: Inés de la Torre (jointly with de Montmorency)
 1615–1624: Laurence de Montmorency (jointly with de la Torre)
 1624–1626: Charlotte de Lannoy
 1626–1638: Marie-Catherine de Senecey 
 1638–1643: Catherine de Brassac
 1643–1666: Marie-Claire de Fleix

Première dame d'honneur  to Maria Theresa of Spain 1660–1683

 1660–1664: Susanne de Navailles 
 1664–1671: Julie de Montausier
 1671–1679: Anne de Richelieu
 1679–1683: Anne-Armande de Crequy

Première dame d'honneur  to Marie Leszczyńska 1725–1768

 1725–1735: Catherine-Charlotte de Boufflers
 1735–1763: Marie de Luynes
 1751–1761: Henriette-Nicole Pignatelli d'Egmont, duchess de Chevreuse (deputy)
 1763–1768: Anne de Noailles (first term)

Première dame d'honneur  to Marie Antoinette 1774–1792

 1774–1775: Anne de Noailles  (second term)
 1775–1791: Laure-Auguste de Fitz-James, Princess de Chimay
 1791–1792: Geneviève de Gramont

Première dame d'honneur  to Joséphine de Beauharnais 1804–1814

 1804–1809: Adélaïde de La Rochefoucauld

Première dame d'honneur to Marie Louise 1810–1814

 1810–1814: Louise Antoinette Lannes, Duchess of Montebello

Première dame d'honneur  to Maria Amalia of Naples and Sicily 1830–1848
 1830–1848:  Christine-Zoë de Montjoye, marquise de Dolomieu

Première dame d'honneur  to Eugénie de Montijo 1853–1870

 1853–1867: Pauline de Bassano
 1867–1870: Marie-Anne Walewska

List of Premières dames d'honneur to the Crown princesses of France
The Household of the wife of the heir to the throne were normally appointed one year before the royal bride arrived to France, so that they could be a part of the royal welcome entourage.

Première dame d'honneur to Maria Anna Victoria of Bavaria 1680–1690

 1679–1684: Anne de Richelieu

Première dame d'honneur to Marie Adélaïde of Savoy 1711–1712

 1711–1712: Marguerite Louise Susanne de Béthune, Duchesse du Lude

Première dame d'honneur to Maria Teresa Rafaela of Spain 1744–1746

 1744–1746: Marie-Angélique Frémyn de Moras, duchesse de Brancas

Première dame d'honneur to Maria Josepha of Saxony, Dauphine of France 1747–1767

 1746–1762: Marie-Angélique Frémyn de Moras, duchesse de Brancas
 1762–1767: Louise-Diane-Françoise de Clermont-Gallerande, duchesse de Brancas

Première dame d'honneur to Marie Antoinette 1770–1792

 1770–1775: Anne de Noailles 
 1775-1791: Laure-Auguste de Fitz-James, Princess de Chimay 
 1791-1792: Geneviève d'Ossun

Première dame d'honneur to Marie Thérèse of France 1814–1830

 1814–1823: Bonne Marie Félicité de Sérent
 1823–1830: Anne-Félicité Simone de Sérent, Duchess de Damas-Cruz

See also
 Mistress of the Robes, British equivalent 
 Camarera mayor de Palacio, Spanish equivalent 
 Chief Court Mistress, Dutch, German, Scandinavian and Russian equivalent

References

 Mathieu da Vinha & Raphaël Masson: Versailles: Histoire, Dictionnaire et Anthologie

Ancien Régime
Ancien Régime office-holders
Government of France
French monarchy
Court titles in the Ancien Régime
Gendered occupations
French ladies-in-waiting
French royal court